Johann Hieronymus Chemnitz (10 October 1730, in Magdeburg – 12 October 1800, in Copenhagen) was a German clergyman and a conchologist.
From 1759 to 1768 he was Chaplain of the Danish Embassy in Vienna, then garrison Chaplain in Helsingør and Copenhagen.

Johann Chemnitz continued the work of Friedrich Wilhelm Martini (1729–1778), Neues systematisches Conchylien-Cabinet. He added to the three volumes previously published eight new volumes in 1779 and 1795.
Although neither of the two authors use the binomial system, they are regarded as the authors of many species which were first described in this work. Chemnitz used many specimens from cabinet of curiosities of the king of Denmark whose conservator was Lorenz Spengler (1720–1807).
Chemnitz began with a collection of half shells before collecting whole shells.  His patron was Christian Hee Hwass (1731–1803).

The 5th volume describes and portrays many shells from New Zealand and some from Australia collected during Cook's voyages into the Pacific.

Note Conchylien-Cabinet von Martini und Chemnitz is an enormous work published
from 1837 up to 1920 with nearly hundred sections, including some 4000 plates. The original work was continued by Heinrich Carl Küster and then Wilhelm Kobelt and Heinrich Conrad Weinkauff.

References

External links

BHL Digital Neues systematisches Conchylien-Cabinet
BHL Typescript index to Neues systematisches Conchylien-Cabinet
 portrait of Gabriel Nicolaus Raspe (1712–1786), the publisher of the first edition of Neues systematisches Conchylien-Cabinet

1730 births
1778 deaths
Conchologists